Stefano Cipressi (born 25 November 1982) is an Italian slalom canoeist who has competed at the international level since 2000.

Cipressi is an athlete of the Gruppo Sportivo della Marina Militare,

Biography
He won a complete set of medals at the ICF Canoe Slalom World Championships with a gold (K1: 2006), a silver (K1 team: 2006), and a bronze (K1 team: 2010). He also won two bronze medals at the European Championships.

Cipressi switched to single canoe (C1) class later on in his career and finished 13th in this event at the 2012 Summer Olympics in London.

World Cup individual podiums

1 World Championship counting for World Cup points

References

2010 ICF Canoe Slalom World Championships 12 September 2010 K1 men's team final results - accessed 12 September 2010.

External links

Italian male canoeists
1982 births
Living people
Canoeists at the 2012 Summer Olympics
Olympic canoeists of Italy
Medalists at the ICF Canoe Slalom World Championships
Canoeists of Marina Militare
21st-century Italian people